Patrick Flannery is an American politician from Kentucky. He is a Republican and represents District 96 in the State House.

He defeated Kathy Hinkle in the 2020 Kentucky House of Representatives election.

References 

Living people
Republican Party members of the Kentucky House of Representatives
21st-century American politicians
Year of birth missing (living people)
Place of birth missing (living people)